The Herd of Sheffield was a charity event in the summer of 2016 in Sheffield, England. Wild in Art organised the public art trail which was run in aid of the Sheffield Children's Hospital Charity. The theme of the project revolved around sculptures of elephants. There were four main parts of the event:
 Little Herd Trail (21 June - 30 September 2016)
 Herd of Sheffield Trail (11 July - 5 October 2016)
 Farewell Weekend (4 - 6 October 2016)
 Auction (20 October 2016).

Inspiration

Choice of a theme 

The inspiration for the elephant theme of the event was that 2016 would be the 100th anniversary of Sheffield's first use of a war elephant. The elephant was named Lizzie and was used to haul ammunition, machinery and raw materials to and from the city's steel factories. Three of the 58 sculptures are named after Lizzie. The use of war elephants in the United Kingdom increased during the First World War because many horses were taken away for military use. Approximately eight million horses died in the war.

Some artists drew inspiration from the First World War to mark Lizzie's anniversary, for example one elephant was painted in a dazzle camouflage pattern, while others incorporated local themes such as Henderson's Relish into their artworks.

Cause 
The purpose of the Herd of Sheffield was to raise money for the Sheffield Children's Hospital with the aim of raising enough money to fund the purchase of a fluoroscopy machine. Aside from the auction, money was raised through selling merchandise such as pens, toy elephants, maps and souvenir books. Rebecca Staden of the Sheffield Children's Hospital Charity came up with the idea of an elephant trail and contacted the Yorkshire-based company Wild in Art which specialises in organising mass public participation art events to help the idea come to fruition.

Herd of Sheffield 

The "Herd of Sheffield" refers both to the whole charity project and the group of large elephants (to distinguish them from the Little Herd). The 1.6 metre tall fiberglass elephants were given to local artists who were tasked with decorating them with whichever medium they chose. In total, 58 large elephant sculptures were designed. As it was the main source of income, the large herd was deemed the most important part of the fundraising project. The event was formally announced on 22 October 2015 alongside the unveiling of the first-completed sculpture.

On 11 July 2016, the Herd of Sheffield Trail started: all 58 elephants were put on display at different locations around the city.  Each elephant was accompanied by a plaque with the elephant's name and description on it. A QR code was also provided for each elephant which enabled users of the Herd of Sheffield app to scan the code and collect discounts from local companies. Thousands of people, both locals and non-locals, went on the trail to participate in the interactive public art event which involved travelling to see all of the elephants. Maps and guidebooks were published to aid elephant spotters.

List of elephants 
The list below gives the titles of the sculptures, their creators, their exhibition location and their auction price.

Little Herd 
In addition to the main herd, a herd of 72 small elephant calves was made by over 70 local schools. The Little Herd was sponsored by Blundells and were displayed in groups at the following locations:
 Winter Gardens
 Crucible Theatre
 Sheffield Hallam University
 Atkinsons
 John Lewis
 The Art House
 Sheffield City Hall
 Ponds Forge
 Kelham Island
 Weston Park Museum
 Abbeydale Industrial Hamlet.

Farewell Weekend 
After the main herd's display period was over, all 58 sculptures were assembled at Meadowhall Centre and displayed between 14 October and 16 October 2016 so viewers could see them one last time before the auction.

Auction 
On 20 October 2016, all 58 elephants of the main herd put on auction at the Crucible Theatre. Charles Hanson, best known for his work on Bargain Hunt, and Lucy Crapper were the auctioneers for the event which raised £410,600.

The winning bidder for Summer donated the elephant for which he paid to local school High Storrs after seeing their art teacher, who was the sculpture's designer, break into tears on losing the bid on behalf of the school.

Sponsors 
Numerous local businesses, organisations and educational institutions sponsored the project along with some national companies including Barclays, John Lewis and Irwin Mitchell.

References

External links 

Charity events in the United Kingdom
Sheffield
Art exhibitions in the United Kingdom
Contexts for auctions
Public art collections